Computershare Limited is an Australian stock transfer company that provides corporate trust, stock transfer, and employee share plan services in many countries.

The company currently has offices in 20 countries, including Australia, the United Kingdom, Ireland, the United States, Canada, the Channel Islands, South Africa, Hong Kong, New Zealand, Germany, and Denmark.

History
Computershare Limited was founded in 1978 in Melbourne, Australia, and has grown largely through overseas acquisitions.

In 1997, the Australian-based Computershare expanded its registry business to include financial markets in New Zealand and the United Kingdom and acquired the Royal Bank of Scotland's registrar department. In subsequent years, it expanded its business into Ireland, South Africa, and Hong Kong. In 2004, Computershare acquired the stock transfer sectors of Harris Bank and Montreal Trust and purchased the German-based Pepper Technologies AG. Since 2004, Computershare has acquired registry companies in Russia and India.

In 2005, it acquired Equiserve.

In 2006 it bought the shareholder management services from National Bank of Canada.

In July 2007, Computershare acquired Datacare Software Group and its products GCM and Boardworks. Currently known as Computershare Governance Services and its main product GEMS.

In February 2008, Computershare announced a cash takeover offer for Australian mailhouse group QM Technologies Limited.

In September 2008, Computershare bought Lichfield based Childcare Voucher Services business called Busy Bees. The name has been re-branded to Computershare Voucher Services or CVS.

In February 2010, Computershare acquired HBOS Employee Equity Solutions from Lloyds Banking Group for a sum of around £40m.

In January 2012, Computershare acquired Shareowner Services (Stock Transfer Sector) from Bank of New York Mellon (BNYM) for a sum of around $550 Million.

In June 2013, Computershare Limited completed the acquisition of the EMEA–based portion of Morgan Stanley's Global Stock Plan Services business.

In December 2015, the Central Bank of Ireland reprimanded and fined Computershare €322,500 for a number of breaches of the law related to the certainty of ownership of client assets.

On 12 November 2018, it completed acquisition of Equatex Group Holding AG, formerly European shares plan business of UBS. The deal was announced on 16 May 2018. All 220+ employees are expected transfer to Computershare as part of the acquisition.

On March 23, 2021, Computershare acquired Wells Fargo Corporate Trust business for $750 million.

Services offered
Computershare primarily provides stock registration and transfer services to companies listed on stock markets, but also offers technology services for stock exchanges, investor services for shareholders and employee share plan management.

Computershare also runs The Deposit Protection Service, a custodial tenancy deposit protection scheme accredited by the UK Government.

References

External Links
 

Australian companies established in 1978
Business services companies established in 1978
Financial services companies established in 1978
Financial services companies of Australia
Companies based in Melbourne
Business process outsourcing companies
Companies listed on the Australian Securities Exchange